The 2015 Laois Senior Hurling Championship was the 119th staging of the Laois Senior Hurling Championship since its establishment by the Laois County Board in 1888. The championship began on 18 July 2015 and ended on 27 September 2015.

The championship was won by Clough–Ballacolla who secured the title following a 0-20 to 1-14 defeat of Camross in the final. This was their 25th championship title and their first in two championship seasons.

Rathdowney–Errill were the defending champions, however, they were defeated in the second round.

Results

Round 1A

Round 2A

Round 2B

Relegation play-off

Quarter-final

Semi-finals

Final

External links

 2015 Laois Senior Hurling Championship

References

Laois Senior Hurling Championship
Laois Senior Hurling Championship